Zovk, is a village in the Kotayk Province of Armenia.

See also 
Kotayk Province

References 

Populated places in Kotayk Province